Tanzania's busiest airports is the list of top busiest airports across various aerodromes in the country. The tables below contain annual data published by the Tanzania Airports Authority on the busiest airports in Tanzania by total passenger traffic, aircraft movements and cargo handled.

The lists are presented in chronological order. The number of total passengers for an airport is measured in persons and includes any passenger that arrives at, departs from or is on a transit from that airport. The number of total aircraft movements is measured in airplane-times and includes all the takeoffs and landings of all kinds of aircraft in scheduled or charter conditions. The total cargo handled is expressed in metric tonnes and includes all the freight and mail that arrives at or departs from the airport.

2017 – 2018

Passenger traffic

Aircraft Movements

Cargo Tonnage

References 

Tanzania
 Busiest
Airports
Airports